Princess Prerana Rajya Lakshmi Devi Shah of Nepal (born 20 February 1978) is the daughter of Gyanendra, the last king of Nepal, and Queen Komal.

Life 
She attended University of Roehampton, Surrey, United Kingdom (BA).

Name Prerana means "Encourage" (Promote).

Princess Prerana married Kumar Raj Bahadur Singh on 23 January 2003. He is the son of Navaraj Bahadur Singh and Usha Devi. The wedding took place at Narayanhity Palace; the bride wore a red sari weaved with gold thread.

Princess Prerana and her husband have one son, Parthav Bahadur Singh, born 10 October 2004.

Abolition of monarchy in Nepal

The Monarchy in Nepal was abolished in 2008 after the Constituent Assembly election.

Health 
On 8 April 2017, Princess Prerana, had been hospitalised after suffering a stroke.

She had been admitted to the Thapathali-based Norvic International Hospital on Saturday morning, confirmed a source on the condition of anonymity.
 
“She might need to stay at the hospital quite longer,” the hospital source said, informing that her condition is stable.

Consultant neurologist Dr Pankaj Jalan has been attending to the former royal.

The hospital has been just giving her “a conservative medication” and observing the effects, the source added.

It has been learned that former King Shah visited his 39-year-old daughter at the Hospital on Friday and Saturday.

On 20 April 2021 the former king and queen tested positive for COVID-19 on their return from the Maha Kumbh, a religious festival in India attended by millions of Hindu pilgrims. The couple and their daughter Prerana Rajya Lakshmi Devi Singh were admitted to the Norvic International Hospital in Kathmandu for treatment.

Patronages 
 Vice-Chairman of The Himani Trust.

Honours
 National Honours
 Member First Class of the Order of Gorkha Dakshina Bahu, 1st class (23/10/2001).
 Member of the Order of Tri Shakti Patta, 1st class (21/10/2005).
 Commemorative Silver Jubilee Medal of King Birendra (31/01/1997).
 King Gyanendra Investiture Medal (04/06/2001).

References

Nepalese princesses
1978 births
Living people
Alumni of the University of Roehampton
Members of the Order of Tri Shakti Patta, First Class
Members of the Order of Gorkha Dakshina Bahu, First Class
21st-century Nepalese nobility
20th-century Nepalese nobility
Nepalese Hindus